Ragnall, Raghnall, Raonall, and Raonull are masculine personal names or given names in several Gaelic languages.

Ragnall occurs in Old Irish, and Middle Irish/Middle Gaelic. It is a Gaelicised form of the Old Norse Røgnvaldr, Rǫgnvaldr, Rögnvaldr. This Old Norse name is composed of two elements: regin, meaning "(German) Gods"; and valr, meaning "powerful". It has also been suggested that Ragnall could also represent the Old Norse Ragnarr as well. Ragnall can be Anglicised as Ranald and Ronald, and Latinised as Reginald, Reginaldus.

The modern spelling is Raghnall in Scottish Gaelic and either Raghnall or Raonull in Irish. Anglicised forms of Raghnall include: Ranald, Rannal, and Ronald.

The final -ll sound of the Gaelic names are de-vocalized, and to non-Gaelic-speakers this suggests -d sound. In this way the name is similar to the various forms of the Gaelic Domhnall, which can be Anglicised as Donald.

List of cognates
Danish: Ragnvald
Dutch: Ronald, Ron, Ronny, Reinout
English: Ranald, Reginald, Reynold, Ronald
Faroese: Røgnvaldur, Ragnvaldur
French: Reynaud
German: Reinhold
Icelandic: Rögnvaldur
Italian: Rinaldo
Latin: Reginald, Reginaldus
Norwegian: Ragnvald
Old French: Reinald, Reynaud
Old German: Raginald
Old Norse: Røgnvaldr, Rǫgnvaldr, Rögnvaldr
Swedish: Ragnvald
Welsh: Rheinallt

List of people with the given name
Ragnall ua Ímair (died 921), king of the Fair and Dark Foreigners and king of Northumbria, the first known Ragnall
Ragnall Guthfrithson (fl. 943-944), King of York
Ragnall mac Gofraid (died 1004/1005), King of the Isles
Ragnall mac Torcaill (died 1146), ruler of Dublin
Ragnall Olafsson (fl. 1164), mediaeval ruler of the Isle of Man
Ragnall Mac Gilla Muire (fl. 1170), leader of Waterford
Raghnall mac Somhairle (died 1207), king of the Isles and Argyll
Raghnall mac Gofraidh (died 1229), king of Mann and the Isles
Raghnall mac Amhlaibh (fl. 1249), king of Mann
Ranald MacDonald (died 1386) founder of Clanranald
Ranald George Macdonald (1788-1873), chief of Clan Macdonald of Clanranald and Member of Parliament
Raonall Smith (born 1978), American, professional American football player

As a patronymic
 Echmarcach mac Ragnaill (fl. 11th century), king of Dublin, Man and the Isles, and the Rhinns
 Ascall mac Ragnaill (died 1171), the last king of Dublin
 Gofraid mac Ragnaill (died 1231), king of the Isles
 Domhnall mac Raghnaill (fl. early-mid 13th century), Hebridean flaith (prince) and progenitor of Clan Donald

See also

References

Masculine given names